Meiser is a surname. Notable people with the surname include:

Bettina Meiser, researcher of the psychosocial aspects of genetics and cancer
Hans Meiser (1881-1956), German Protestant theologian
Jonas Meiser (born 1999), German footballer
Pat Meiser, American women's basketball coach